The Royal Lancashire Show (RLS) is an agricultural show which takes place every year at different locations throughout the historical county boundaries of Lancashire in North England. The show is organised by the Royal Lancashire Agricultural Society (RLAS) and is one of Britain's oldest agricultural shows, first taking place in 1767. In 2017 it took place on 11–13 August.

History
 1767: Start of the Royal Lancashire Agricultural Society.
 1954: From this year the show was at Stanley Park, Blackpool for many years.
 1972: Blackpool Zoo opened, taking up a large part of Stanley Park. The show had to move. The Royal Lancashire Agricultural Show bought land at Ribby Hall, Wrea Green.
 1979: Shortage of money forced the society to cease all activities for some years.
 Later: At various sites in Lancashire, including Witton Park, Blackburn.
 Later: for many years at Astley Park in Lancashire.
 2003 to 2007: On land at Salesbury Hall Farm near Ribchester.
 2006: Hot dry weather gave the show a good profit.
 2007: Weeks of heavy rain waterlogged the ground and forced cancellation.
 2008: Planned to be at Myerscough near Preston, Lancashire, Friday 18th to Sunday 20 July; heavy rain on 16 July night turned the ground into a mudbath and forced the show organizers to keep the public out on 18 July, but the animal classes on 18 July were judged. Further rain forced cancellation for 19 and 20 July. These two cancellations cost the society over £550,000,
 2009: No show this year. The Society abandoned the Myerscough site, as it waterlogged easily in wet weather. The show was planned for Duke of Lancaster Park at Bilsborrow, but was cancelled as there was not enough time to rearrange the show, and lack of funds due to the 2008 cancellation.
 2010: No show. 
 2011: No show.
 2012: Held in May in Witton Park, Blackburn in good weather.
 2013: No show. 
 2014: No show. 
 2015: Held on 7–9 August in good weather at Salesbury Hall near Ribchester.
 2016: Royal Lancashire Show was held at Witton Park, Blackburn on 12–14 August.
 2017: Royal Lancashire Show held at Salesbury Hall, Ribchester, 11–13 August.
 2018: Royal Lancashire Show was held on 20–22 July at Salesbury Hall
2020 - Cancelled due the COVID-19 pandemic
2021/2022: Held in July at Salesbury Hall

References

External links
 RLS website

Lanc
Culture in Lancashire
1767 establishments in England
Festivals established in 1767